Gavin Dacey, born 19 October 1984 in Merthyr Tydfil, Wales, is a rugby union player for, and Vice Captain of Pontypridd RFC in the Principality Premiership.

Dacey attained his 100th appearance for Pontypridd RFC on 31 October 2009 in the Principality Premiership game against Cardiff RFC.

Dacey's position of choice is as a Centre.

External links
Pontypridd RFC profile

References

1984 births
Living people
Pontypridd RFC players
Rugby union players from Merthyr Tydfil
Welsh rugby union players
Rugby union centres